Charles Edward Banks (born January 4, 1964) is a former professional American football player who played fullback in the National Football League for the Houston Oilers and the Indianapolis Colts. He played college football at West Virginia Tech and was drafted in the 12th round (310th overall pick) of the 1986 NFL Draft.

References
http://www.nfl.com/players/chuckbanks/profile?id=BAN442976
https://web.archive.org/web/20070211133423/http://www.databasefootball.com/players/playerpage.htm?ilkid=BANKSCHU01

1964 births
Living people
Players of American football from Baltimore
American football fullbacks
West Virginia University Institute of Technology alumni
Houston Oilers players
Indianapolis Colts players
National Football League replacement players